Deps is a 1974 Yugoslavian film directed by Antun Vrdoljak and starring Bekim Fehmiu, Milena Dravić, Fabijan Šovagović and Relja Bašić.

External links
 

1974 films
1970s Croatian-language films
Jadran Film films
Films set in Zagreb
Films set in Croatia
Films set in Yugoslavia
Croatian drama films
1974 drama films
Yugoslav drama films